The following species in the flowering plant genus Pavetta are accepted by Plants of the World Online. An important distinguishing trait for the genus is the dark nodules on their leaves, which house bacterial endosymbionts.

Pavetta abujuamii 
Pavetta abyssinica 
Pavetta aethiopica 
Pavetta agrostiphylla 
Pavetta akeassii 
Pavetta amaniensis 
Pavetta andongensis 
Pavetta angolensis 
Pavetta angustifolia 
Pavetta ankasensis 
Pavetta ankolensis 
Pavetta antennifera 
Pavetta arenicola 
Pavetta arenosa 
Pavetta aspera 
Pavetta australiensis 
Pavetta axillaris 
Pavetta axillipara 
Pavetta backeri 
Pavetta baconiella 
Pavetta bagshawei 
Pavetta balinensis 
Pavetta bangweensis 
Pavetta barbata 
Pavetta barbertonensis 
Pavetta barnesii 
Pavetta basilanensis 
Pavetta batanensis 
Pavetta batesiana 
Pavetta bauchei 
Pavetta bequaertii 
Pavetta bidentata 
Pavetta bidgoodiae 
Pavetta bilineata 
Pavetta blanda 
Pavetta bomiensis 
Pavetta bourdillonii 
Pavetta bowkeri 
Pavetta brachyantha 
Pavetta brachycalyx 
Pavetta brachysiphon 
Pavetta breviflora 
Pavetta brevituba 
Pavetta bridsoniae 
Pavetta brownii 
Pavetta bruceana 
Pavetta bruneelii 
Pavetta brunonis 
Pavetta buchneri 
Pavetta burttii 
Pavetta buruensis 
Pavetta calothyrsa 
Pavetta cambodiensis 
Pavetta camerounensis 
Pavetta candelabra 
Pavetta canescens 
Pavetta capensis 
Pavetta cataractarum 
Pavetta catophylla 
Pavetta caudata 
Pavetta celebica 
Pavetta cellulosa 
Pavetta chapmanii 
Pavetta chevalieri 
Pavetta cinerascens 
Pavetta cinereifolia 
Pavetta claessensii 
Pavetta coelophlebia 
Pavetta comostyla 
Pavetta condorensis 
Pavetta conferta 
Pavetta constipulata 
Pavetta cooperi 
Pavetta coronifera 
Pavetta corymbosa 
Pavetta crassicaulis 
Pavetta crassipes 
Pavetta crebrifolia 
Pavetta crystalensis 
Pavetta cumingii 
Pavetta curalicola 
Pavetta decumbens 
Pavetta delicatifolia 
Pavetta dianeae 
Pavetta diversicalyx 
Pavetta diversipunctata 
Pavetta dolichantha 
Pavetta dolichosepala 
Pavetta dolichostyla 
Pavetta edentula 
Pavetta elliottii 
Pavetta elmeri 
Pavetta erlangeri 
Pavetta eylesii 
Pavetta fascifolia 
Pavetta filistipulata 
Pavetta fruticosa 
Pavetta gabonica 
Pavetta galpinii 
Pavetta gardeniifolia 
Pavetta gardneri 
Pavetta genipifolia 
Pavetta geoffrayi 
Pavetta gerstneri 
Pavetta glaucophylla 
Pavetta gleniei 
Pavetta globularis 
Pavetta glomerata 
Pavetta gorontalensis 
Pavetta gossweileri 
Pavetta graciliflora 
Pavetta gracilifolia 
Pavetta gracilipes 
Pavetta gracillima 
Pavetta granitica 
Pavetta greenwayi 
Pavetta grossissima 
Pavetta grumosa 
Pavetta gurueensis 
Pavetta haareri 
Pavetta harborii 
Pavetta herbacea 
Pavetta hispida 
Pavetta hispidula 
Pavetta hohenackeri 
Pavetta holstii 
Pavetta hongkongensis 
Pavetta hookeriana 
Pavetta humilis 
Pavetta hymenophylla 
Pavetta inandensis 
Pavetta incana 
Pavetta indica 
Pavetta indigotica 
Pavetta intermedia 
Pavetta involucrata 
Pavetta ixorifolia 
Pavetta johnstonii 
Pavetta kasaica 
Pavetta kedahica 
Pavetta kimberleyana 
Pavetta klotzschiana 
Pavetta kotzei 
Pavetta kribiensis 
Pavetta kupensis 
Pavetta kyimbilensis 
Pavetta laevifolia 
Pavetta lampongensis 
Pavetta lanceolata 
Pavetta lasiobractea 
Pavetta lasiocalyx 
Pavetta lasioclada 
Pavetta lasiopeplus 
Pavetta laurentii 
Pavetta laxa 
Pavetta leonensis 
Pavetta lescrauwaetii 
Pavetta leytensis 
Pavetta lindina 
Pavetta linearifolia 
Pavetta loandensis 
Pavetta lomamiensis 
Pavetta longibrachiata 
Pavetta longiflora 
Pavetta longistyla 
Pavetta lulandoensis 
Pavetta lutambensis 
Pavetta luzonica 
Pavetta lynesii 
Pavetta macraei 
Pavetta macropoda 
Pavetta macrosepala 
Pavetta madrassica 
Pavetta makassarica 
Pavetta malchairii 
Pavetta manyanguensis 
Pavetta matumbiensis 
Pavetta mayumbensis 
Pavetta mazumbaiensis 
Pavetta melanochroa 
Pavetta membranacea 
Pavetta membranifolia 
Pavetta micheliana 
Pavetta micrantha 
Pavetta microphylla 
Pavetta micropunctata 
Pavetta microthamnus 
Pavetta mildbraedii 
Pavetta mindanaensis 
Pavetta minor 
Pavetta mirabilis 
Pavetta mocambicensis 
Pavetta mollis 
Pavetta mollissima 
Pavetta moluccana 
Pavetta molundensis 
Pavetta montana 
Pavetta monticola 
Pavetta mpomii 
Pavetta mshigeniana 
Pavetta muelleri 
Pavetta mufindiensis 
Pavetta muiriana 
Pavetta multiflora 
Pavetta murleensis 
Pavetta mzeleziensis 
Pavetta namatae 
Pavetta nana 
Pavetta napieri 
Pavetta natalensis 
Pavetta naucleiflora 
Pavetta nemoralis 
Pavetta neurocarpa 
Pavetta nitidissima 
Pavetta nitidula 
Pavetta nova-guineensis 
Pavetta obanica 
Pavetta oblanceolata 
Pavetta oblongifolia 
Pavetta obovalis 
Pavetta oligantha 
Pavetta olivaceonigra 
Pavetta oliveriana 
Pavetta ombrophila 
Pavetta opulina 
Pavetta oresitropha 
Pavetta orthanthera 
Pavetta owariensis 
Pavetta palembangensis 
Pavetta pammalaka 
Pavetta parasitica 
Pavetta parvifolia 
Pavetta paupercula 
Pavetta petiolaris 
Pavetta phanerophlebia 
Pavetta pierlotii 
Pavetta pierrei 
Pavetta platycalyx 
Pavetta platyclada 
Pavetta plumosa 
Pavetta pocsii 
Pavetta praeterita 
Pavetta pseudoalbicaulis 
Pavetta puberula 
Pavetta puffii 
Pavetta pumila 
Pavetta pygmaea 
Pavetta quasidigita 
Pavetta radicans 
Pavetta redheadii 
Pavetta refractifolia 
Pavetta reinwardtii 
Pavetta renidens 
Pavetta revoluta 
Pavetta richardsiae 
Pavetta rigida 
Pavetta robusta 
Pavetta roseostellata 
Pavetta ruahaensis 
Pavetta rubentifolia 
Pavetta rupicola 
Pavetta ruttenii 
Pavetta ruwenzoriensis 
Pavetta rwandensis 
Pavetta salicina 
Pavetta sansibarica 
Pavetta sapoensis 
Pavetta sarasinorum 
Pavetta scabrifolia 
Pavetta schliebenii 
Pavetta schumanniana 
Pavetta schweinfurthii 
Pavetta sennii 
Pavetta sepium 
Pavetta seretii 
Pavetta siamica 
Pavetta siphonantha 
Pavetta sonjae 
Pavetta sparsipila 
Pavetta spathulata 
Pavetta speciosa 
Pavetta sphaerobotrys 
Pavetta staudtii 
Pavetta stemonogyne 
Pavetta stenosepala 
Pavetta stipulopallium 
Pavetta subcana 
Pavetta subcapitata 
Pavetta subferruginea 
Pavetta subglabra 
Pavetta subumbellata 
Pavetta subvelutina 
Pavetta suffruticosa 
Pavetta sumbawensis 
Pavetta swatowica 
Pavetta sylvatica 
Pavetta talbotii 
Pavetta tarennoides 
Pavetta teitana 
Pavetta tendagurensis 
Pavetta tenella 
Pavetta tenuissima 
Pavetta ternifolia 
Pavetta testui 
Pavetta tetramera 
Pavetta thwaitesii 
Pavetta tomentosa 
Pavetta tonkinensis 
Pavetta trachyphylla 
Pavetta transjubensis 
Pavetta translucens 
Pavetta travancorica 
Pavetta trichardtensis 
Pavetta troupinii 
Pavetta tschikonderi 
Pavetta umtalensis 
Pavetta uniflora 
Pavetta urophylla 
Pavetta urundensis 
Pavetta vaga 
Pavetta valetonii 
Pavetta vanderijstii 
Pavetta vanwykiana 
Pavetta venenata 
Pavetta villosa 
Pavetta viridiloba 
Pavetta wallichiana 
Pavetta whiteana 
Pavetta wightii 
Pavetta wildemannii 
Pavetta williamsii 
Pavetta yambatensis 
Pavetta zeyheri 
Pavetta zeylanica 
Pavetta zimmermanniana

References

Pavetta